The Guatiquía River originates on the Chingaza páramo at , from its roots in the jurisdiction of the municipio of Quetame (departament of Cundinamarca, Colombia.
The river splits in two arms taking the names of Río Negrito and Río Guayuriba. Both arms end in the Meta River.

Rivers of Colombia